Stanniocalcin-1 is a glycoprotein, a homologue of a hormone stanniocalcin, first discovered in bony fishes. In humans it is encoded by the STC1 gene.

Function 

This gene encodes a secreted, homodimeric glycoprotein that is expressed in a wide variety of tissues and may have autocrine or paracrine functions. The only known molecular function of human Stanniocalcin-1 to date is a SUMO E3 ubiquitin ligase activity in the SUMOylation cycle. However, STC1 interacts with many proteins in the cytoplasm, mitochondria, endoplasmatic reticulum, and in dot-like fashion in the cell nucleus. The N-terminal region of STC1 is the function region which is responsible to establish the interaction with its partners, including SUMO1. Low-resolution studies shows that STC1 is an anti-parallel homodimer in solution and the cysteine 202 is responsible for its dimerization. All the 5 disulfide bonds of human STC1 are conserved and have the same profile of fish STC. The gene contains a 5' UTR rich in CAG trinucleotide repeats. The encoded protein contains 11 conserved cysteine residues and is phosphorylated by protein kinase C exclusively on its serine residues.

The protein may play a role in the regulation of renal and intestinal calcium and phosphate transport, cell metabolism, or cellular calcium/phosphate homeostasis. Overexpression of human stanniocalcin 1 in mice produces high serum phosphate levels, dwarfism, and increased metabolic rate. This gene has altered expression in hepatocellular, ovarian, and breast cancers, and is a putative molecular biomarker of leukemic microenvironment.

References

Further reading